The Italy has sent athletes to every celebration of the modern Summer Olympic Games with the uncertain exception of the 1904 Summer Olympics. The Italian National Olympic Committee (CONI) is the National Olympic Committee for the Italy.

Medals

Medals by sport
Update to Tokyo 2020.

See also
Italy at the Olympics
Italy at the Olympics in athletics
Italy at the Winter Olympics

References

External links